The 2009–10 F.C. Motagua season was the fifty-fifth season of Motagua's professional football lifetime.  It consisted of two halves, the Apertura, which ran from July to November 2009, and the Clausura, which ran from January to May 2010.

Apertura

During the preseason, several members of the team were poisoning presenting stomach pain and four of them were interned in a clinic. Iván Guerrero, Johnny Leverón, Romel Murillo and Carlos Padilla, were the players that were taken to the hospital due to severe dehydration. The rest of the team took a medical evaluation at the headquarters of the club. Following this incident, the coach Juan de Dios Castillo has suspended training for a couple of days.

Squad

Transfers in

Transfers out

Standings

Matches

Pre-season

Regular season

Semifinals

 Motagua 1–2 Olimpia on aggregate.

Clausura

The 2009–10 Clausura season for C.D. Motagua was somewhat bittersweet, they manage to finish on first position in the Regular season, an honor not accomplished since December 2001; they overcame in Semifinals beating C.D. Platense with difficulties; however lost in the Final against Club Deportivo Olimpia in spite of having shown great football.

Squad

Transfers in

Transfers out

Standings

Matches

Pre-season

Regular season

Semifinals

 Motagua 2–2 Platense on aggregate; Motagua advanced on better Regular season performance.

Final

 Motagua 2–3 Olimpia on aggregate.

References

External links
Motagua Official Website

F.C. Motagua seasons
Motagua
Motagua